The 2018 Rhythmic Gymnastics European Championships was the 34th edition of the Rhythmic Gymnastics European Championships, which took place on 1–3 June 2018 at the Palacio Multiusos de Guadalajara in Guadalajara, Spain.

Participating countries

Competition schedule
Friday June 1
10:30–12:40 CI juniors individual hoop and ball Set A
12:50–15:00 CI seniors individual hoop and ball Set B
15:45–17:55 CI seniors individual hoop and ball Set C
18:00–18:30 Opening Ceremony
18:30–20:00 CI senior groups 5 hoops
Saturday June 2
09:00–10:25 CII juniors individual clubs and ribbon Set A1
10:35–12:00 CII juniors individual clubs and ribbon Set A2
12:10–13:25 CII senior groups and junior individual Set A
13:30–14:30 CII senior groups and junior individual Set B
15:15–16:15 CII senior groups and junior individual Set C
16:20–17:20 CII senior groups and junior individual Set D
17:25–18:25 CII senior groups and junior individual Set E
18:30 Award Ceremony – Team Competition
18:30 Award Ceremony – Senior groups all around 
Sunday June 3
10:00–11:00 CIII Apparatus finals juniors hoop and ball
11:10–12:10 CIII Apparatus finals juniors clubs and ribbon
12:15–12:30 Award Ceremony – Hoop-Ball-Clubs-Ribbon
12:30–13:10 CIII senior groups finals 5 hoops
13:15–13:55 CIII senior groups finals 3 balls and 2 ropes
14:00–14:15 Award Ceremony – 5 hoops
14:00–14:15 Award Ceremony – 3 balls and 2 ropes
15:00–17:00 CII senior individuals Set B
17:10–19:10 CII senior individuals Set A
19:15–19:30 Award Ceremony – Senior individuals
19:40–20:00 Closing Ceremony
Source:

Medal winners

Results

Team

Junior Individual

Hoop

Ball

Clubs

Ribbon

 Note: Asterisk sign (*) informs that score was under inquire

Senior Individual

All-around

Senior Groups

Group all-around

5 Hoops

3 Balls + 2 Ropes

Medal table

References

External links
 Event website

Rhythmic Gymnastics European Championships
European Rhythmic Gymnastics Championships
International gymnastics competitions hosted by Spain
2018 in Spanish sport
Sport in Guadalajara, Spain
June 2018 sports events in Spain